For Confederate Memorial Hall, see Memorial Hall, Vanderbilt University.

Alumni Hall is a historic building on the campus of Vanderbilt University in Nashville, Tennessee. Designed in the Collegiate Gothic style by Henry C. Hibbs, it was built in 1925 to commemorate the 44 Vanderbilt men who died in World War I. It was added to the National Register of Historic Places in 2011. The building was renovated in 2013 and is currently used as a student center.

References

Vanderbilt University
Buildings and structures in Nashville, Tennessee
National Register of Historic Places in Nashville, Tennessee
University and college buildings on the National Register of Historic Places in Tennessee
School buildings completed in 1925
1925 establishments in Tennessee